Once Upon a Brothers Grimm is a 1977 American made-for-television musical fantasy film starring Dean Jones and Paul Sand, directed by Norman Campbell. It follows the Brothers Grimm as they make their way to a king's palace with their magical world of fairy tales. The music was written by Mitch Leigh with lyrics by Sammy Cahn. The two-hour film premiered on CBS on November 23, 1977.

Plot 
Jacob and Wilhelm Grimm are traveling to a king's palace to present him with their fairy tales. Their carriage driver refuses to take them into the woods because they are said to be enchanted. Not wanting to miss their audience with the king, the brothers buy the carriage from the driver and travel into the woods alone. Placed under the enchantment of the woods, the brothers begin to encounter a wide range of characters that exist in their tales, including Snow White and Sleeping Beauty among many others.

List of Grimm Fairy Tales referenced in the film 
 Snow White
 Sleeping Beauty
 Town Musicians of Bremen
 The Golden Goose
 Hansel and Gretel
 Little Red Riding Hood
 Rumpelstiltskin
 The Six Swans
 The Twelve Dancing Princesses (or "The Shoes that were Danced to Pieces")
 The Frog Prince
 Cinderella

Cast 
 Dean Jones as Jacob Grimm
 Paul Sand as Wilhelm Grimm
 Arte Johnson as Selfish and Mean
 Sorrell Booke as King of Hesse

Segments

Hansel and Gretel
 Todd Lookinland as Hansel
 Mia Bendixsen as Gretel 
 Chita Rivera as Gingerbread Lady
 Edie McClurg as Esmeralda

Cinderella
 Stephanie Steele as Cinderella
 Corinne Conley as Fairy Godmother
 John McCook as Prince Charming
 Gordon Connell as Driver

Sleeping Beauty
 Joanna Kirkland as Sleeping Beauty
 John Clifford as The Prince
 Los Angeles Ballet

Little Red Riding Hood
 Susan Silo as Little Red Riding Hood
 Dean Jones as Grandmother
 Cleavon Little as The Big Bad Wolf

The Frog Prince
 Teri Garr as Princess
 Ken Olfson as The King

The Bremen Town Musicians
 Don Correia as The Ass
 Joe Giamalva as The Rooster
 Gary Morgan as The Hound
 Maria Pogee as The Cat

The King with Eight Daughters
 Clive Revill as Rumplestiltskin
 Ruth Buzzi as Queen Astrid
 Dan Tobin as Prime Minister

Awards 
Once Upon a Brothers Grimm was nominated for five Primetime Emmy Awards in 1978 and won two of them.

Wins 
 Outstanding Individual Achievement in Children's Programming (Bill Hargate, costume designer)
 Outstanding Individual Achievement in Children's Programming (Robert Checchi, set decorator; Ken Johnson, art director)

Nominations 
 Outstanding Individual Achievement in Children's Programming (Larry Abbott, makeup; Tommy Cole, makeup; Michael G. Westmore, makeup)
 Outstanding Individual Achievement in Children's Programming (Jerry Greene, video tape editor)
 Outstanding Children's Special

See also 
 The Wonderful World of the Brothers Grimm (1962)
 The Brothers Grimm (2005)

External links 
 
 

1970s children's fantasy films
1970s musical fantasy films
1977 television films
1977 films
American children's fantasy films
American musical fantasy films
CBS network films
Cultural depictions of the Brothers Grimm
Films based on Grimms' Fairy Tales
Films based on fairy tales
1970s English-language films
1970s American films